Inferior horn can refer to:
 Inferior horn of thyroid cartilage
 Inferior horn of lateral ventricle